General elections were held in the Cook Islands on 1 May 1968. The result was a victory for the Cook Islands Party (CIP), which won 16 seats, a gain of two from the 1965 elections. The newly formed United Cook Islanders won the other six seats to become the parliamentary opposition. CIP leader Albert Henry continued as Prime Minister.

Campaign
In February a new party, the United Cook Islanders (UCI), was formed. Its members included former cabinet members Mana Strickland and Manea Tamarua. The new party launched its manifesto on 8 April.

A total of 55 candidates contested the elections; 23 from the CIP (two candidates from the party ran against each other in Pukapuka, and four candidates from the party contested the three seats in Takitumu), 18 from the UCI and six independents. Former Leader of Government Business Dick Charles Brown had intended to run as an independent, but withdrew. The CIP candidates were returned unopposed in Mauke and Mitiaro.

The campaign period during April saw meetings held almost every night, with CIP meetings initially drawing crowds of several hundred, rising to over 1,300 by the end of the campaign. In contrast, UCI meetings were usually attended by fewer than 100 people.

Results
The CIP won all nine seats in Rarotonga, and gained the three Aitutaki seats, which had been won by the Independent Group in 1965. The UCI's former ministers, Strickland and Tamarua, both lost their seats.

Elected members

References

Further reading

Elections in the Cook Islands
Cook
General election
Cook Islands general election